The 2011 Sarasota Open was a professional tennis tournament played on outdoor green clay courts. It was part of the 2011 ATP Challenger Tour. It took place in Longboat Key, Florida, United States between April 23 and May 1, 2011.

Entrants

Seeds

 Rankings are as of April 18, 2011.

Other entrants
The following players received wildcards into the singles main draw:
  Vamsee Chappidi
  Andrea Collarini
  Lester Cook
  Mac Styslinger

The following players received entry from the qualifying draw:
  Philip Bester
  Pierre-Ludovic Duclos
  Wayne Odesnik
  Morgan Phillips

Champions

Singles

 James Blake def.  Alex Bogomolov Jr., 6–2, 6–2

Doubles

 Ashley Fisher /  Stephen Huss def.  Alex Bogomolov Jr. /  Alex Kuznetsov, 6–3, 6–4

External links
Official website

Sarasota Open
Sarasota Open
Sarasota Open
2011 in American tennis